Salisbury University (Salisbury) is a public university in Salisbury, Maryland. Founded in 1925, Salisbury is a member of the University System of Maryland, with a fall 2022 enrollment of 7,123.

Salisbury University offers 47 distinct undergraduate and 17 graduate degree programs across six academic units: the Fulton School of Liberal Arts, Perdue School of Business, Henson School of Science and Technology, Seidel School of Education and Professional Studies, College of Health and Human Services, and Clarke Honors College. The Salisbury Sea Gulls compete in Division III athletics in the Capital Athletic Conference, while the football team competes in the New Jersey Athletic Conference.

History

Salisbury University, originally called the Maryland State Normal School, opened on September 7, 1925, as a two-year institution to train elementary school teachers to help fill the teacher shortage in the state of Maryland. The original class of 105 students was greeted by Salisbury's first president, William J. Holloway, an experienced educator and the driving force behind the creation of the school. 

The curriculum was influenced by those established at Columbia's Teachers College, alma mater of six of Salisbury Normal School's eight original faculty. During the Great Depression, Maryland extended the required course of study at normal schools from two years to three years, and to four years in 1934, paving the way for the institution to become Maryland State Teachers College one year later.

In 1935, the school's name was changed to Maryland State Teachers College, and in 1963 to Salisbury State College. Between 1962 and 1995, several master's degree programs were approved, and in 1988, the name was changed to Salisbury State University. In 2001, the name was changed to Salisbury University.

Since the early 2000s, Salisbury has grown rapidly in academic enrollment as well as campus facilities. Since 2002, Henson Hall, Conway Hall, Perdue Hall, the Patricia R. Guererri Academic Commons, and Sea Gull Stadium have been constructed.

Since the appointment of University President Janet Dudley-Eshbach in 2000, Salisbury has experienced significant growth campus-wide: expanding with over $350 million in new facilities, increasing student enrollment by over 2,000, and developing the first doctorate programs in nursing practice and education.

From July 1, 2018 through July 14, 2022, the university was under the leadership of president Charles "Chuck" Wight. Wight succeeded Dudley-Eschbach, who, after 18 years as SU's president, opted to return to teaching foreign language at SU, following one year in hiatus training Wight. Carolyn Ringer Lepre, Ph.D. began her term as the 10th president of Salisbury University on July 15, 2022.

Following two incidents of racist vandalism in 2019, students asked for "the safety and inclusion of black students and other minority groups on campus". After a third incident, in 2020, the president cancelled classes for a Day of Healing. In June 2020, "Jerome K. Jackson, an African American man," confessed to having caused the vandalism.

Campus facilities

Holloway Hall
Holloway Hall served as the original home of Maryland State Normal School at Salisbury upon its opening in 1925. The structure once served as the home for all teaching, student, and administrative functions at the school. Today, the building – renamed Holloway Hall after the retirement of Salisbury's first president, William J. Holloway – houses administrative offices, including the office of the president, the office of the provost, financial aid, registrar, public relations, student health services, and human resources. 

The building also contains a number of unique, multi-purpose spaces, including the auditorium (seating capacity of 713) and the great hall (originally used as the dining hall and later as the home for the Ward Museum of Wildfowl Art). The classroom space in the north wing of the structure was once the home of the Perdue School of Business.

Fulton Hall
Fulton Hall serves as home for The Charles R. and Martha N. Fulton School of Liberal Arts at Salisbury University. The building serves as the north anchor of the campus's central mall. As the structure closest to Holloway Hall, Fulton Hall was built to complement Holloway's classical architecture styling. 

Fulton Hall includes the main university gallery (home to temporary art exhibitions), classrooms, fine arts studios, photography lab, and a glass blowing facility. The building is also home to many of the university's performing arts facilities, including a 150-seat black box theater (featuring a flexible 50 x 50 ft performance space), scene shop, costume shop, and music rehearsal facilities.

Conway Hall

Conway Hall, formerly known as the Teacher Education and Technology Center, opened for use at the beginning of the 2008 fall semester. In 2009, the  building earned silver certification from the Leadership in Energy and Environmental Design (LEED) certification system under the United States Green Building Council. The building also earned the distinction of being named one of the ten best-designed new higher education facilities by College Planning & Management magazine as part of its "2009 Education Design Showcase" issue.

The facility houses flexible classroom space, multi-purpose computer lab space, a satellite dining facility, distance-learning classrooms, integrated SMART classroom technology, and offices and support services for the Seidel School, Fulton School, and information technology. The showcase integrated media center, located on the third floor of the facility, includes both high-definition and standard-definition television production studios, twenty individual editing suites (video-audio), and audio production facilities.

The building was renamed in April 2016 for former Maryland Delegate Norman Conway, who as chairman of the House Appropriations Committee assisted SU in securing funding for the project, and is an SU alumnus.

Henson Hall
Henson Hall was dedicated on September 5, 2002, and contains classroom, support, and laboratory space for the Henson School of Science and Technology. Built at a cost of $37 million, the  facility houses the departments of biology, chemistry, physics, mathematics and computer science, and geography and geosciences. The building holds 12 classrooms, 32 teaching laboratories, and 20 research labs. Henson Hall also houses a satellite dining facility, which students call "the Airport" in reference to the building's namesake, test pilot Richard A. Henson.

Perdue Hall
The new building for the Franklin P. Perdue School of Business was partially funded by an $8 million gift from the Arthur W. Perdue Foundation. Perdue, Inc., chairman Jim Perdue said the donation was in honor of his father, former Perdue Farms president Frank Perdue. The , $56 million facility houses classroom and office space formerly located in the north wing of Holloway Hall. 

The university was awarded gold certification from the LEED certification system under the United States Green Building Council for the Perdue building. The facility includes a Business Outreach Services Suite (BOSS), a Small Business Development Center, a Perdue Museum, meeting rooms, focus-group rooms, specialized business lab space, an internet cafe, and an M.B.A. suite with case rooms.

Patricia R. Guerrieri Academic Commons
Opened in the Fall of 2016, the Patricia R. Guerrieri Academic Commons (GAC) officially opened as the largest and tallest building on campus. The facility cost $117 million and houses the student library, IT help desk, Edward H. Nabb Research Center for Delmarva History and Culture, writing center, center for student achievement, a math emporium, and a 3D printing lab. 

The building contains 400 computers for public use, Chesapeake Bay Roasting Company and Hungry Minds Express food vendors, and 15 study rooms situated around the four-story, 221,000-square-foot academic commons. The library participates in an inter-campus loan program where students can order books from other university libraries within the University System of Maryland for temporary use. 

The library was named one of the "Top 20" in the United States by the Princeton Review in their 2021 "Best 386 Colleges", alongside other higher education institutions such as Columbia University and Williams College.

Guerrieri Student Union/The Commons

The south end of campus is home to the Guerrieri Student Union (GSU) and The Commons, both buildings are joined together by an indoor walkway called the "Link of Nations". The GSU houses the office of student affairs, student activities office, two eateries (Chick-fil-A and internet cafe Cool Beans), career services office, the center for student achievement, and a large, multi-level lounge space. 

The Commons contains the campus bookstore and post office located in the basement, the main dining hall facility located on the first floor, and conference rooms located on the second floor.

Residence Halls 
There are currently ten on-campus dormitory residence halls and one on-campus apartment complex at Salisbury University. Pocomoke, Nanticoke, Wicomico, Manokin, Choptank, Chester, Severn, Chesapeake, St. Martin, and Dogwood Village are the dormitory halls. Sea Gull Square is a 600-bed apartment-style complex located near GSU and is currently the newest residential building at Salisbury University. 

The dormitory halls are laid out with a variety of floor plans, including cluster and suite-style. All traditional residence halls (Pocomoke, Nanticoke, Wicomico, and Manokin) underwent extensive renovations to be converted to suite-style facilities. The first completed dorm, Pocomoke Hall, opened prior to the spring 2010 semester, with renovations to the other three facilities completed by August 2011. Sea Gull Square also opened in August 2011.

Off-campus housing 
Salisbury University houses approximately 40% of all students in 2,648 spaces of campus-affiliated housing, with freshmen given priority in traditional housing. In addition to the on-campus residence buildings, Salisbury has partnerships with four nearby off-campus apartment complexes and one townhome neighborhood, Seagull Village, The Flatts, The Gathering, University Orchard, and University Park, with residents of these facilities (with the exception of Seagull Village) having access to a shuttle system to the main campus. The Gathering is a townhome neighborhood located about five minutes away from the main campus. 

Seagull Village was originally intended to house international students only and had been leased by the university, however, Salisbury University ultimately bought the apartment complex for $3.6 million in March 2022, allowing any students to move into Seagull Village starting in Fall 2022.

A new off-campus apartment complex, labeled "The Ross", is under construction and is slated to open in time for the Fall 2023 semester. The Ross will be the furthest off-campus complex away from the school, located six minutes away from the main campus (roughly 2.2 miles). It is expected to be one of the tallest buildings in the Delmarva peninsula.

Honors House

Honors House was established in 2000, and is located off Camden Avenue, across east campus. It is open to students in the Clarke Honors College, and includes a full kitchen, computer lab, and grand piano. The yard contains a gazebo, goldfish pond, and a Japanese garden.

Campus grounds: arboretum status

The Salisbury University campus was recognized by the American Association of Botanical Gardens and Arboreta as an arboretum in 1988. The Salisbury campus features over 2,000 species of plant life, including magnolia, rhododendron, viburnum, Japanese maple, bald cypress, and Crape myrtle. Notable areas of interest on campus include the Pergola (near the University Commons), the Holloway Hall Courtyard Garden, the Bellavance Honors Center Japanese Garden, the Link of Nations, and the Miller Alumni Garden. The campus also features a collection of figurative sculpture, including pieces by such noted sculptors as Auguste Rodin (Coquelin Cadet), Daniel Chester French (Ralph Waldo Emerson), Augustus Saint-Gaudens (Diana), and Carl Akeley (Wounded Comrade).

Academic schools and programs
There are six academic units at the university, five of which are endowed.

Salisbury University offers 47 distinct undergraduate and 17 graduate degree programs. Popular majors include biology/biological sciences, business administration and management, kinesiology and exercise science, and psychology. The school's nursing program is well known for its difficulty and selective admissions.

The Thomas E. Bellavance Honors Program was established in 1981, and the Glenda Chatham and Robert G. Clarke Honors College was created in 2016, and endowed in 2020.

The Business, Economic, and Community Outreach Network (BEACON) is the applied research, experiential learning, and community outreach arm of the Franklin P. Perdue School of Business at Salisbury University.

The Institute for Public Affairs and Civic Engagement (PACE) was launched in 1999 to promote non-partisan civic engagement.

Clarke Honors College
The National Collegiate Honors Council named the Clarke Honors College publication The Saunterer the No. 1 honors print newsletter in the U.S. in 2017, 2019 and 2022.

College of Health and Human Services
U.S. News & World Report has ranked SU’s Doctor of Nursing Practice, Master of Science in Nursing and Master of Social Work among the nation’s best graduate programs. 

Based on recent data from the Maryland Board of Nursing, Salisbury University nursing students have the highest 10-year average pass rate among all University System of Maryland institutions on the NCLEX examinations for registered nurses, averaging at 91.6%.

The Center for Healthy Communities, established in 2020, promotes CHHS efforts in community-based learning, community service grants, workforce development and professional continuing education opportunities. Programs include the School of Social Work’s Behavioral Integration in Pediatric Primary Care (BHIPP) and School of Nursing’s Faculty Academic and Mentorship Initiative of Maryland

The Center for Healthy Communities was awarded a $1.98 million grant from the Health Resources and Services Administration to establish the SU Eastern Shore Opioid-Impacted Family Support Program (OISP).

SU’s Richard A. Henson Medical Simulation Center celebrated a decade of success in 2022. Under the Henson School at its founding in 2012, the center has provided education, promoted quality and patient safety, stimulated research and scholarship, and integrated evidence into clinical practice through the provision of invaluable simulation experiences for SU health professions students and community health care professionals.

In 2019, CHHS extended program offerings across the state with the launch of SU’s bachelor’s degree public health (then community health) at the University of Maryland at Hagerstown (USMH) and master’s degree in health and human performance (then applied health physiology) at the Universities at Shady Grove (USG).

In addition, the School of Social Work offers students across Maryland and abroad the opportunity to pursue degrees, with satellite programs through Cecil College, the Eastern Shore Higher Education Center at Chesapeake College, USM at Southern Maryland, USM at Hagerstown, and University of Maryland Global Campus Europe. The school also offers a dual-degree program in social work/sociology with the University of Maryland Eastern Shore.

Henson School of Science and Technology
Students in the Fulton School’s Creative Writing Program have published poems and short stories in national peer-reviewed journals and literary magazines, and have won prominent awards including the Pablo Neruda Prize for Poetry.

Speakers in the “One Person Can Make a Difference Series,” hosted by the Fulton School’s Bosserman Center for Conflict Resolution, have included Nobel laureates Lech Walesa (former president of Poland) and F.W. de Klerk (former president of South Africa).

In 2020, the United Nations designated the Bosserman Center as the home of United Nations University Regional Centre for Expertise Salisbury, a designated hub of expertise in conflict prevention and creative problem solving.

Through the Bosserman Center, SU also has been a designated United Nations Millennium Campus. Since 2020, some 29 SU students have been named UN Millennium Fellows, designing projects to assist in the achievement of the UN Foundation’s 17 Sustainable Development Goals.

Dr. Arun Gandhi, grandson of Indian leader Mahatma Gandhi, has co-taught conflict analysis and dispute resolution courses in the Fulton School as the Bosserman Center’s scholar-in-residence and led SU students during study abroad trips to India.

Speakers in SU’s Paul S. Sarbanes Lecture Series, hosted by the Fulton School-affiliated Institute for Public Affairs and Civic Engagement, have included civil rights leader John Lewis and Speaker of the U.S. House Nancy Pelosi. (U.S. President Joe Biden has served as an SU Commencement speaker.)

If the costumes in the Fulton School’s Bobbi Biron Theatre Program productions look like something from a New York sound stage … they are! Costume designer Leslie Yarmo, associate professor of theatre, formerly served as costume designer for TV’s Law & Order: Special Victims Unit and has held assistant designer and consultant roles with movies including Will Smith’s I Am Legend and the Tina Fey/Amy Poehler comedy Baby Mama. With her help, SU theatre students have interned on productions such as The Chaperone, starring Downtown Abbey’s Elizabeth McGovern. 

Philosophy students in the Fulton School help to change lives through a longstanding book discussion program with inmates at nearby Eastern Correctional Institution through a partnership between SU and the Maryland Department of Public Safety and Correctional Services.

Other unique offerings include the annual SU Philosophy Symposium, which has provided a forum for students and members of the greater community to discuss issues with philosophy scholars for more than 40 years, and “Re-envisioning Ethics Access and Community Humanities,” a National Endowment for the Humanities-funded program aimed at including an ethics component in undergraduate education experiences for fields including health, social work and public administration.

Six SU environmental studies students in the Fulton School have earned the prestigious U.S. Environmental Protection Agency Greater Research Opportunity (EPA-GRO) Fellowship, giving them the chance to work side-by-side with EPA officials through paid internships while also earning college funding for their junior and senior year, worth up to $50,000.

All environmental studies students study at a campus ranked as one of the top 50 “Green Colleges” in the U.S. by The Princeton Review and U.S. Green Building Council. They learn in the field and along the banks of the Chesapeake Bay from top-rated faculty including John Burroughs Award-winning environmental author Tom Horton.

The Fulton School is the home of Lit/Film Quarterly, the longest-standing international journal devoted to the study of literature adaptation to film, founded in 1973.

Henson School of Science and Technology
Since its launch in 2015, SU’s M.S. in Geographic Information Systems (GIS) Management has been consistently ranked among the nation’s best online graduate program in the field and earned the American Association of Geographers 2022 Program Excellence Award.

The Henson School’s integrated science major, launched in fall 2020, was the first of its kind in the University System of Maryland.

The National Science Foundation has awarded Henson School faculty and students over $7 million in grant funding. 

The Henson School’s high-performance computing lab, established using funds from a $2.5 million gift from the Richard A. Henson Foundation in 2017, features a Beowulf cluster designed for both classroom instruction as well as a research cluster. 

The Eastern Shore Regional GIS Cooperative (ESRGC), founded in 2004, partners with municipal, county, regional, state and federal governments, as well as private and non-profit organizations, in an effort to develop data-driven decision-making tools. The cooperative has established over 50 partnerships and are the Eastern Shore’s leader in GIS services.

In 2022, the Henson School opened SU’s REAL Robotics Lab, establishing a home base for the GULLS VEXU Robotics Team and research space for STEM students. The lab consists of drone and 3-D printing labs, engineering workstations, and a competition standard VEX robotics arena.

Perdue School of Business
Since 2018, U.S. News & World Report has ranked the Perdue School’s online M.B.A. program as one of the nation’s best.

The Perdue School is home to the nation’s second longest-running student entrepreneurship competition, first held in 1987, with a current annual prize pool of some $100,000.

Since 2013, the Perdue School also has been home to the Philip E. and Carole R. Ratcliffe Foundation Shore Hatchery entrepreneurship competition, through which small business owners and developers throughout the Mid-Atlantic vie twice a year for their share of a $200,000 prize pool and mentorship from some of the region’s most successful business owners. Recipients have self-reported estimated profits of some $100 million, creating nearly 700 jobs.

The Perdue School twice has hosted national auditions for the hit ABC-TV show Shark Tank, with several Ratcliffe Foundation Shore Hatchery winners appearing and receiving business investment offers from the show’s judges.

The Perdue School’s Mid-Atlantic Sales and Marketing Institute (MASMI) annually hosts students from around the U.S. for the National Shore Sales Challenge, a collegiate competition that allows students to sharpen their sales skills while networking with potential employers from more than a dozen national corporations.

Since 2001, Perdue School students have had the opportunity to earn real-world stock market experience through the Sea Gull Fund, a unique student-managed investment portfolio — currently valued at more than $2 million — with gains that have outperformed the Standard & Poor’s average.

Through a $2.6 million grant from the U.S. Department of Health and Human Services, Fraud and Forensic Accounting Certificate Program students in the Perdue School are partnering with the Office of the State’s Attorney of Worcester County to help investigate and curb elder fraud in what is believed to be the only program of its kind in the nation.

Through the Cross-Atlantic Negotiation Competition, Perdue School students virtually join their counterparts at the University of Bucharest School of Law to practice international negotiation skills as part of a Fulbright-inspired faculty partnership.

The Perdue School’s Dave and Patsy Rommel Center for Entrepreneurship provides business and prototyping resources for students and community members, including a full makerspace.

Additional Academic Highlights
SU is the No. 1 Fulbright Student producing institution in the Master’s Carnegie Classification for 2022-23 (nine Student Fulbrights awarded). Since 2012, SU has had 34 Fulbright students.

SU also has been recognized by the U.S. Department of State’s Bureau of Educational and Cultural Affairs as one of the top producers of Fulbright Scholars (faculty).

In the past decade, SU students have won more than 100 national and international fellowships, including the National Science Foundation Greater Research Fellowship, Charles B. Rangel Scholarship, Barry M. Goldwater Scholarship, Critical Language Scholarship, David L. Boren Scholarship and Gates Cambridge Scholarship.

SU consistently is named among the best universities in the U.S. by guides including U.S. News & World Report, The Princeton Review and Forbes.

U.S. News & World Report, Money, Kiplinger’s Personal Finance, Forbes and Washington Monthly have named SU among the best college values in the nation.

SU’s Patricia R. Guerrieri Academic Commons twice has been named a “Best College Library” (top 25 in the U.S.) by The Princeton Review.

The Princeton Review and U.S. Green Building Council have named SU among the nation’s top 50 “Green Colleges.”

Some 81% of soon-to-be SU graduates have reported accepting a job offer prior to graduation, and 98% of graduates seeking employment are employed within one year after graduation.

Some 95% of incoming SU students receive scholarships and financial aid, with a 21% increase in merit scholarship funding announced for those enrolling for the 2023-24 academic year. Beyond that, in fiscal 2022, the SU Foundation, Inc. administered some $1.5 million in scholarship funding.

SU’s Business, Economic and Community Outreach Network (BEACON) has estimated the University’s regional economic impact at some $480 million.

SU graduates join a growing network of more than 60,000 alumni worldwide, working for corporations including Amazon, JPMorgan Chase & Co., NASA, Perdue Farms, Under Armour and The Walt Disney Co., to name just a few.

Admissions and enrollment

Admissions
Salisbury University's Office of Admissions is responsible for the processing of all admissions applications. For undergraduate admissions for the Fall 2022 entry term, Salisbury received 7,691 applications and Salisbury offered admission to 86% of those applicants.

SAT-optional policy
In the fall of 2006 the Faculty Senate at Salisbury University approved a plan to make the SAT an optional submission for admission to the university.

Cost
For 2022-23, tuition and fees for Maryland residents were $10,396 annually, $20,872 for non-Maryland residents. Average room and board cost was $12,780.

Enrollment
Between 2009 and 2022, the total enrollment varied between 8,204 and 7,123; in 2022, 83.4% were Maryland residents. In 2022, there were 5,853 full-time undergraduates, 525 part-time undergraduates, 433 full-time graduate students, and 312 part-time graduate students. In 2022, the undergraduate student body was 71.0% white, 13.9% African American, 11.2% other minority, and 1.2% non-resident alien (i.e., international student). In 2022, among all students, 54.7% were from the Western Shore of Maryland, 28.7% were from the Eastern Shore of Maryland, 14.2% were from out-of-state, and 2.4% were international students.

Graduation rates and outcomes
In 2022, according to the U.S. Department of Education's College Scorecard, 79% of full-time undergraduate students returned after their first year, and the six-year graduate rate was 71%. Among full-time students, 8 years after enrolling, some 71% had graduated, 22% has transferred, and 7% withdrew. The median annual earnings of students who received federal financial aid, 10 years after entering the university, was $53,388.

Salisbury University Brand: "Make Tomorrow Yours"
In 2021, Salisbury University launched a new brand, "Make Tomorrow Yours," pledging the following:

Salisbury University is a place where you’ll be seen, heard, supported, celebrated and challenged in a welcoming environment that feels like a second home. You’ll be mentored by professors and have the opportunity for hands-on projects, study abroad adventures and internships. You can make tomorrow yours here – and own it – in a way that will propel you forward in your life, community and career – across Maryland and beyond.

Brand Pillars
A Warm and Friendly Environment

Faculty Who Open Doors for Students

Opportunities for Students

Affordability and Return on Investment

Athletics

Salisbury University has ten female and nine male Division III NCAA teams. The football team competes in the New Jersey Athletic Conference while all other sports participate in the Capital Athletic Conference. SU is well known for the success of its athletic programs, amassing 22 national championships in team sports and 24 individual national championships in track and field and wrestling.

Mascot
The university mascot is named "Sammy Sea Gull." The Sea Gull name evolved from the Salisbury State College Golden Gulls, which was chosen in a 1948 contest. In 1963, the mascot was changed to a sea gull because the school's athletic teams were often referred to as the SSC Gulls (C-Gulls), and the nickname "Sammy Sea Gull" followed in the 1970s.

Regents Cup and Charles B. Clark Cup

In addition to regular-season and tournament play, the Sea Gulls compete twice a year against other local universities. In the fall, the football team competes against Frostburg State University for the Regents Cup. In the spring, the men's lacrosse team competes against Washington College for the Charles B. Clark Cup; this annual event being known among the two institutions as the "War on the Shore", and the two schools take turns every year hosting the event.

Relay For Life
The American Cancer Society's Relay For Life is the largest on-campus event at Salisbury University. SU's Relay For Life has consistently raised thousands of dollars annually, making Salisbury University one of the top Relay teams, per capita, in the nation, raising over 1.5 million dollars since its inception. The event traditionally takes place at Maggs Physical Activities Center and Henson Hall Lawn.

Sea Gull Century
This annual bike ride, usually held the first weekend in October, brings thousands of riders to Delmarva, in what is the largest single-day tourism event in Wicomico County. The  ride has been named among the top ten century rides in the nation by Bicycling Magazine. The Washington Post named it "by far the most popular local century" in the Maryland-Delaware-Virginia region. The ride starts and ends at SU, offering two routes. It is well known for its scenic halfway point at Assateague Island.

Internationalization and study abroad

Study-abroad programs

Salisbury students have the opportunity to attend study-abroad courses through the Salisbury Abroad Semester Program. This program is offered primarily during the Fall and Spring semesters, but courses are also offered during the shorter Winter term. While abroad, SU students and other international students study with local students and immerse themselves in their country of interest. In these programs, all classes are taught by local professors.

International students and English Language Institute

In the early 2010s, approximately 18 percent of the Salisbury University student population studied abroad, slightly higher than the national undergraduate average of 14% during the 2010–11 academic year. In 2011, the U.S Department of State designated Salisbury University as an authorized participant in the J-1 Exchange Visitor program, in the categories of Student and Professor.

The university created the English Language Institute (ELI) in 2010.

International students represent 2% of the student population at Salisbury University, which is less than University of Maryland College Park (10%), Towson University (6–7%), University of Maryland Baltimore County (6–7%), and University of Maryland Eastern Shore (4–5%).

In 2010, Salisbury University established a sister-institution partnership with Anqing Teachers College, in Anhui Province, China. The first two Salisbury University undergraduate students to study there did so during the entire Fall Semester in 2010. In turn, two undergraduate students and one graduate student were the first Chinese students to come to Salisbury University from Anqing.

Greek life
Fraternities
Alpha Sigma Pi
Alpha Phi Alpha 
Kappa Alpha Psi
Kappa Sigma
Omega Psi Phi
Pi Lambda Phi
Sigma Tau Gamma
Sigma Phi Epsilon
Sigma Pi
Sigma Alpha Epsilon

Sororities
Lambda Theta Alpha
Delta Xi Phi
Alpha Kappa Alpha
Alpha Sigma Tau
Delta Gamma
Delta Sigma Theta
Phi Mu
Zeta Tau Alpha

Notable alumni 

Eric Arndt, professional wrestler competing in WWE as Enzo Amore
Jake Bergey, former professional lacrosse player
Steve Bisciotti, owner of the Baltimore Ravens
Talmadge Branch, member of the Maryland House of Delegates
Eric M. Bromwell, member of the Maryland House of Delegates
Norman Conway, former member of the Maryland House of Delegates
Jeremiah "Jay" Copeland, American Idol finalist
Jeannie Haddaway, former member of the Maryland House of Delegates
Kyle Hartzell, Premier Lacrosse League player
Tae Johnson, director of U.S. Immigration and Customs Enforcement
Scott Krinsky, actor and comedian known for Chuck
Erica Messer, writer for The OC, Alias, and Criminal Minds
Dale Midkiff, actor
Frank Perdue, former president of Perdue Farms; major contributor to Salisbury University
Jim Perdue, chairman of Perdue Farms
Dan Quinn, defensive coordinator for the Dallas Cowboys
Justin Ready, member of the Maryland State Senate
Kenneth D. Schisler, former chair of the Maryland Public Service Commission
Mike Seidel, Weather Channel meteorologist
J. Lowell Stoltzfus, former member of the Maryland State Senate
Kris Valderrama, former member of the Maryland House of Delegates
Kristen Visbal, sculptor known for Fearless Girl
Byron Westbrook, football player of the Washington Commanders
Jennifer Hope Wills, actress known for The Phantom of the Opera on Broadway
Mary Willis (US Army officer) (born January 31, 1940), retired US Army Brigadier General

References

External links

Official website
Official athletics website

 
1925 establishments in Maryland
Buildings and structures in Salisbury, Maryland
Educational institutions established in 1925
Universities and colleges in Wicomico County, Maryland
Public universities and colleges in Maryland
University System of Maryland campuses